Megachile manchuriana is a species of bee in the family Megachilidae. It was described by Yatsumatsu in 1939.

References

Manchuriana
Insects described in 1939